Opilio lepidus is a species of harvestman in the Phalangiidae family. In 1937, members of the species were found in Lankaran, Azerbaijan.

References

Animals described in 1878
Fauna of Azerbaijan
Harvestmen
Lankaran